Carlavirus, formerly known as the "Carnation latent virus group", is a genus of viruses in the order Tymovirales, in the family Betaflexiviridae. Plants serve as natural hosts. There are 53 species in this genus. Diseases associated with this genus include: mosaic and ringspot symptoms.

Description
Carlavirus is described in the 9th report of the ICTV (2009). The genus is characterised by having six ORFs (open reading frames) including a TGB (Triple Gene Block). The viruses are transmitted by insects.

Taxonomy
The genus was first proposed in the first report of the ICTV in 1971, as the 'Carnation latent virus group' but was renamed in 1975 as the 'Carlavirus group', and as the genus Carlavirus in 1995 (6th report). In 2005 (8th report) it was placed in the Flexiviridae family, having previously been unassigned. The current position in the 9th report (2009) as a genus of the family Betaflexiviridae derives from the subsequent subdivision of Flexiviridae.

The following species are assigned to the genus:

Aconitum latent virus
American hop latent virus
Atractylodes mottle virus
Blueberry scorch virus
Butterbur mosaic virus
Cactus virus 2
Caper latent virus
Carnation latent virus
Chrysanthemum virus BCole latent virusColeus vein necrosis virusCowpea mild mottle virusCucumber vein-clearing virusDaphne virus SGaillardia latent virusGarlic common latent virusHelenium virus SHelleborus mosaic virusHelleborus net necrosis virusHippeastrum latent virusHop latent virusHop mosaic virusHydrangea chlorotic mottle virusKalanchoe latent virusLigustrum necrotic ringspot virusLigustrum virus ALily symptomless virusMelon yellowing-associated virusMirabilis jalapa mottle virusNarcissus common latent virusNerine latent virusPassiflora latent virusPea streak virusPhlox virus BPhlox virus MPhlox virus SPoplar mosaic virusPotato latent virusPotato virus HPotato virus MPotato virus PPotato virus SRed clover vein mosaic virusSambucus virus CSambucus virus DSambucus virus EShallot latent virusSint-Jan onion latent virusStrawberry pseudo mild yellow edge virusSweet potato C6 virusSweet potato chlorotic fleck virusVerbena latent virusYam latent virusVirology
The virions are non enveloped, filamentous, 610–700 nanometers (nm) and 12–15 nm in diameter.

The linear 5.8–9 kilobase genome is positive sense, single-stranded RNA. The 3’ terminus is polyadenylated. In some species the 5’ end is capped. The genome encodes 3 to 6 proteins including a coat protein located at the 3' end and an RNA-dependent RNA polymerase located at the 5' end of the genome.

Life cycle
Viral replication is cytoplasmic, and is lysogenic. Entry into the host cell is achieved by penetration into the host cell. Replication follows the positive stranded RNA virus replication model. Positive stranded RNA virus transcription is the method of transcription. The virus exits the host cell by tripartite non-tubule guided viral movement. Plants serve as the natural host.

Transmission
Infection is at times spread by aphids in a semi-persistent mode, that is, the vector is infective for a number of hours.(Pimentel) Some species are transmitted by Bemisia tabaci'' in a semi-persistent mode or through the seed. Most species infect only a few hosts and cause infections with few or no symptoms, for example, American hop latent virus and lily symptomless virus. Some, such as blueberry scorch virus and poplar mosaic virus, cause serious illnesses. (Foster)

References

Bibliography 
 
 Astier, S. Principles of Plant Virology 
 Foster, Gary. "Carlavirus Isolation and RNA Extraction." Foster, Gary D. and Sally C. Taylorin. Plant Virology Protocols: From Virus Isolation to Transgenic Resistance. Page 145. 1998. Humana Press. Online. February 13, 2008.
 Pimentel, David. Encyclopedia of Pest Management.Page 407. CRC Press. 2002/ Google Books. Online February 13, 2008..

External links

 The Taxonomicon. Online. February 28, 2008.
 Viralzone: Carlavirus
 ICTV

Carlaviruses
Virus genera
Viral plant pathogens and diseases